Finn Haunstoft (8 July 1928 – 12 May 2008) was a Danish sprint canoer who competed in the 1950s. Competing in two Summer Olympics, he won the gold in the C-2 1000 m event at Helsinki in 1952.

References

1928 births
2008 deaths
Canoeists at the 1952 Summer Olympics
Canoeists at the 1956 Summer Olympics
Danish male canoeists
Olympic canoeists of Denmark
Olympic gold medalists for Denmark
Olympic medalists in canoeing
Sportspeople from Aarhus
Medalists at the 1952 Summer Olympics